The Battle of Pookkottur was one of the battles that the Mappilas of Malabar fought against the British army during anti-colonial struggles in 1921 in Malabar province of Northern Kerala. The battle took place on 26 August 1921 at Pookkottur in present-day Malappuram district under the leadership of Vadakkuveettil Mohammed, the Secretary of khilafat committee in Malabar region led the force of Variyankunnath Kunjahammad Haji while Cuthbert Buxton Lancaster and Captain P McEnroy were leading the British force. The Battle of Pookkottur adorns an important role in Malabar rebellion.

Background

The Khilafat movement was much popular in Pookkottur, Malappuram, Kerala. After the outbreak of Malabar rebellion in 1921 the British army and police were forced to retreat from these areas. A group of British officials stuck in Malabar, including Malappuram district Magistrate Austin. They asked the district administration to bring force for their rescue. The force left Kozhikkode to Pokkottur in 22 Lorries and 25 cycles under Captain McEnroy and CB Lancaster. This information reached to Kunjahammed Haji and he discussed the matter with Pookkottur leaders including Vadakkuvettil Mammad and Kunji Thangal. They decided to attack the British army at Pookkottur. Rebels prepared themselves for war under the leadership of Mammad.

The Battle

On 1921 August 21 morning, rebels reached the spot, British force came in 22 Lorries and 25 cycles. The rebels' strategy was to let their lorries enter till they reach Pilakkal, then to besiege them from all the sides. But Parancheri Kunjarammutty who was not present in the last meeting of the rebels did not know this strategy, Kunjarammutty who was hiding behind the heap of soil opened the fire at the first lorry while there were only two or three Lorries reached the field. Hearing the gunshots, the army reversed the lorries. They threw smoke bombs to all the sides. Due to smoke rebels couldn't aim their guns properly. Bullets lost their targets. Still, they made heavy casualties to the military. Behind the veil of smoke, the military made to set machine guns to fire. When the smoke subsided, about ten soldiers walked on the road by foot towards Pilakkal. Without knowing that this was a trap, rebels came forward to capture them. Soldiers suddenly turned back and hid behind the machine guns and started firing. The rebels who followed them were killed. This round of firing happened two times and a number of rebels got killed. Kunjarammutty,  who opened fire at the first with other rebels, came out on the field with swords when they had no more bullets in stock and they fought unto their last breath. Vadakkuveetil Mammad, the commander of rebels also was killed. The war continued for more than 3 hours and 400 rebels had to give their blood while only four died from the British side as per the official documents, but the eyewitness A Muhammed in his book "Swathandrasmaranakal" (Malayalam) says that he has seen the two lorries going to Westhill, Kozhikode which contained many dead bodies including injured soldiers.

After the battle was fought, the army was on the way to Malappuram with Superindent of Police Cuthbert Buxton Lancaster (Lancaster was the son of a Leader in Church of England) and four soldiers in a lorry at the front. At Kummalippadi, a Mappila rebel, Mankara Thodiyil Kunjahmmed climbed on a tree and threw a grenade into the lorry in which police and soldiers were travelling. Lancaster and several soldiers were killed on the spot.

References

 

Mappilas
Kerala
History of Kerala
Indian independence movement in Kerala